Count Dracula is a 1970 gothic horror film directed by Jesús Franco, based on the novel Dracula by Bram Stoker. It stars Christopher Lee, Herbert Lom and Klaus Kinski.

Although Count Dracula stars Lee in the title role, it is not a Hammer production like his other Dracula films, being produced instead by Harry Alan Towers. Klaus Kinski, who would play Dracula himself nine years later in Nosferatu the Vampyre, is also featured in the film as Renfield. Count Dracula was advertised as the most faithful adaptation of Bram Stoker's novel. Among other details, it was the first film version of the novel in which Dracula begins as an old man and becomes younger as he feeds upon fresh blood.

Plot 
Jonathan Harker, a lawyer traveling from London to Transylvania to secure property for Count Dracula, arrives at Bistritz to stay for the night. There, he is warned by a concerned lady against continuing his journey. Believing that her concerns are rooted in peasant superstition, he ignores her, but starts to feel unnerved by the way everyone looks at him. Harker later arrives at the Borgo Pass, where the Count's mysterious coachman picks him up.

Harker disembarks at Castle Dracula, and the coach immediately rushes off. Harker approaches the main door and meets a thin, tall, gaunt old man. He turns out to be Dracula and takes Harker to his bedchamber. There, Harker notices that Dracula casts no reflection.

Later, Harker goes to sleep and wakes in an ancient crypt where three beautiful vampiresses harass him. Dracula rushes into the room and orders them to leave Harker alone. He then gives them a baby to feed on. Harker wakes up screaming in his room and assumes it was a nightmare, but two small wounds on his neck indicate otherwise.

Harker soon realises he is a prisoner, and tries to escape by climbing out his bedroom window. He finds his way back to the crypt where Count Dracula and his three brides rest in coffins. Harker runs out of the crypt screaming, and jumps out of the castle's tower into the river below.

Harker wakes up in a private psychiatric clinic outside London, owned by Dr. Van Helsing, in the care of Dr. Seward. He is told he was found delirious in a river near Budapest. No one believes his story about Castle Dracula until Van Helsing finds the two punctures on Harker's neck. Harker's fiancée Mina and her close friend Lucy also arrive to help take care of him. Unbeknownst to them, Count Dracula has followed Harker back to England and now resides in an abandoned abbey close to the hospital.

As Mina takes care of Harker, her friend Lucy's health strangely declines. Dracula has been secretly appearing to her by night and drinking her blood, growing younger as he feeds off his victim. Quincey Morris, Lucy's fiancé, joins Drs. Seward and Van Helsing in an attempt to save Lucy by giving her blood transfusions.

One of the patients at the clinic, R. M. Renfield, becomes of considerable interest to the men. Renfield is classed as a zoophagus: he eats flies and insects in order to consume their life, believing that each life he consumes increases his own. He reacts violently whenever Dracula is nearby. He later dies from shock.

Lucy eventually dies, becomes one of the undead and murders a young child. The ordeal is put to an end when Quincey, Seward and Van Helsing ambush Lucy, stake her through the heart and decapitate her. Harker, restored to health, joins the group who now are sure that Count Dracula is a vampire.

Dracula turns his attention to Mina and begins corrupting her as well. Van Helsing suddenly has a stroke and remains in a wheelchair. Dracula visits the weakened man, mocking his attempts to destroy him. Quincey, Harker and Seward track Dracula to the abandoned abbey, but he has fled to Transylvania with the aid of a traveling Gypsy band.

As Count Dracula's Gypsy servants take him back to his castle, he is trailed by Harker and Quincey. After battling the Gypsies, the two heroes find Dracula's coffin and set it on fire. Dracula, unable to escape in full daylight, is consumed by flames.

Cast 
 Christopher Lee as Count Dracula
 Herbert Lom as Professor Abraham Van Helsing
 Klaus Kinski as R.M. Renfield
 Frederick Williams as Jonathan Harker
 Maria Rohm as Mina Murray
 Soledad Miranda as Lucy Westenra
 Paul Muller as Dr. John "Jack" Seward
 Jack Taylor as Quincey Morris
 Jesús Puente as the Minister of Interior
 Franco Castellani as Renfield's Warden

Production

Filming
The film was shot at the Tirrenia Studios and on location in Spain. The film's sets were designed by the art director Karl Schneider.

Release

Reception
Robert Firsching of The New York Times wrote, "This doggedly faithful adaptation is plodding and dull. Even Christopher Lee (in an uncharacteristically weak performance as Dracula), Klaus Kinski (as the mad Renfield), and seven credited screenwriters cannot make this confused, distant film worthwhile. Franco appears as a servant to Professor Van Helsing (Herbert Lom), and though certainly literate, the film nevertheless fails as both horror and drama."

Brett Cullum of DVD Verdict wrote, "For curious Dracula fans, Jess Franco's Count Dracula is a neat find. It's a stellar cast working under a low budget, and it comes off entertaining if not a classic. It's a B-movie treatment at best, but... Lee comes off fiery and committed to making this Count one that will be noticed." Brian Lindsey of Eccentric Cinema wrote, "Upon weighing [the film's] pros and cons, Count Dracula emerges a substantially flawed film. But I can still recommend it to any fan of Lee, Franco, Miranda, and even of Stoker's novel." George R. Reis of DVD Drive-In wrote, "Count Dracula is flawed in many ways, but for fans of gothic horror, it's still irresistible... Barcelona naturally allows for some truly handsome scenery and an appropriate castle for Dracula to dwell in, and the performances of the international cast are above average."

Dracula scholar Leslie S. Klinger said "the picture begins well, closely following the Stoker narrative account of Harker's encounter with Dracula. The film rapidly proceeds into banality, however, and except for the characterization of Lee as an older Dracula and the brilliant Kinski, the film is largely forgettable."

Film critic Jonathan Rosenbaum called it "one of the world's worst horror films" in his review of Pere Portabella's film Cuadecuc, Vampir, which was shot during the making of this film.

Home media
Count Dracula was released on DVD in 2007 by Dark Sky Films. Special features include an interview with director Jesús Franco, a reading from Bram Stoker's Dracula novel by Christopher Lee, and a text essay on the life of actress Soledad Miranda. The DVD has come under criticism for omitting the scene in which a distraught mother pleads for her baby's life at the door of Dracula's castle. The DVD also uses the Italian credits for the film but with the French title card Les Nuits de Dracula.

See also
 Vampire films

References

External links 

 
 Count Dracula at Variety Distribution
 
 
 Count Dracula at the Dark Sky Films website.

1970 films
1970 horror films
British horror films
German horror films
British vampire films
German vampire films
Italian vampire films
Spanish vampire films
West German films
1970s English-language films
English-language German films
English-language Italian films
English-language Spanish films
Films directed by Jesús Franco
Films scored by Bruno Nicolai
Films shot in Barcelona
Dracula films
Gloria Film films
Films shot at Tirrenia Studios
Films set in castles
German supernatural horror films
1970s British films
1970s Italian films
1970s German films